Gol TV is a Latin American pay television channel dedicated exclusively to soccer, part of Tenfield. Transmits to all Latin America.

Ownership

In Montevideo, Uruguay is Tenfield S.A. Broadcasting Corporation is the parent company of Gol TV. Enzo Francescoli is its Executive and Managing Director.

Programming 
 Primeira Liga
 Ecuadorian Serie A
 Ecuadorian Serie B (only for Ecuador)
 Paraguayan Primera División (except Paraguay) 
 Peruvian Primera División  (only for Carlos A. Mannucci, Deportivo Municipal, Sport Boys and Universitario home matches) (except Peru)
 Primera División Uruguaya (except Uruguay)
 Venezuelan Primera División
 KNVB Cup
 Johan Cruyff Shield
 Copa do Brasil
 Campeonato Carioca

Programs
 Ecuadorian Football - A weekly magazine with the best of the Serie A of Ecuador, the table, the positions, the scorers, as well as the best plays.
 Golazos Special - A summary of the best goals of the leagues that GolTV transmits.
 Uruguayan Football – Football Uruguayan He will experience the thrills of Uruguayan football date after date.
 Arsenal 360 – a review of what happened in the last week, Arsenal best moves, analysis, exclusive interviews with the players.
 Super League – Every week the best of Super League Greece GOLTV.LAT have it.
 Foot Brazil - A weekly series that provides a recap and highlights of all the games from the São Paulo State Championship and the Brasileirão Serie A, as well as interviews with the biggest stars of Brazilian soccer. It airs on Wednesdays at 7pm and 10pm US Eastern Time.
Tu Football Venezuela - Venezuelan All tracking date after date with football goals, highlights and interviews of the Venezuelan League.
 Especial GolTV - Interviews with prominent figures of Uruguayan football and / or world, from Uruguay by Martin Charquero, renowned personalities of world football.
 Fanaticos - is a talk show personalities of football and traveled by clubs.
 Fechas Pasadas - Recalling memorable matches of Uruguayan football.

GOL TV HD
 GOL TV HD is a 1080i high definition simulcast of GOL TV which launched in late October 2014. It's a big bet for new times of change in the channel, currently available por5 July 6 Telecable La Paz Las Piedras Personal TV, TCC (Uruguay), VTR, Telsur, GTD Manquehue, Movistar Colombia, Movistar Chile, Megacable, Movistar TV (Peru), Claro Colombia, Cable TV Group.
 In late October 2014 the HD signal is released, for all Latin America. On April 3 Nelson Gutierrez, vice president of GolTV Latin America, said "We are excited, all our content, are from now on the highest quality", "GolTV HD was our subject slope, we wanted to be bringing all our audience this unique experience; enjoy the football in the best definition. To do this we make a huge effort and modernize our technology in order to provide a higher level of image "

Gol TV Play
 Signal transmissions available for football games on your android, tablet, apple, etc. device currently has exclusive first division of Uruguay, available Cable TV Group.

See also
 GolTV Canada
 GOL TV
 Gol TV (Ecuadorian TV channel)

References

 http://www.adslzone.net/article3131-mediapro-confirma-el-precio-de-gol-tv-en-las-plataformas-de-television-de-pago.html
 http://www.configurarequipos.com/actualidad-informatica/655/goltv-tdt-de-pago-para-agosto
 https://web.archive.org/web/20090904230709/http://deportes.orange.es/futbol/noticias/espn_y_goltv_acuerdan_compartir_los_derechos_de_la_liga_espanola_en_ee.uu..shtml
 http://www.sys-con.com/node/171463
 https://web.archive.org/web/20090812100559/http://www.onoweb.net/index.php?option=com_content&view=article&id=3936:gol-tv-dara-la-mitad-de-los-partidos-del-barca&catid=1:noticias&Itemid=260
 http://www.goltv.tv/pressroomdownloads/MexicoLindo_SPA.pdf
 https://web.archive.org/web/20101123024803/http://goltvlat.com/index.php?target=sobregoltv
 http://noticias.terra.com/articulos/act1822578/GolTV_y_ESPN_se_asocian_para_ofrecer_una_cobertura_sin_precedentes_de_la_liga/
 Cuando Dish network contrato el Servicio de GOL TV 
 https://web.archive.org/web/20140201215833/http://www.noticias24.com/deportes/noticia/1821/el-principe-francescoli-y-su-goltv-le-tiran-una-gambeta-a-la-crisis/
 http://www.goltvar.com/Goltv/servlet/home?1,0,0,
 https://web.archive.org/web/20120910233705/http://www.tenfieldigital.com.uy/TenfielDigital/servlet/hppal

External links
 
 Gol TV Canada
 Gol TV Latinoamérica

Television channels and stations established in 2003
Soccer in Florida
Association football on television
Spanish-language television stations
English-language television stations
Latin American cable television networks
Sports television networks